This is a list of the French SNEP Top 200 Singles and Top 200 Albums number-ones of 2016.

Number ones by week

Singles chart

Albums chart

Top Ten best sales

These are the ten best-selling albums in 2016

Albums

See also
2016 in music
List of number-one hits (France)
List of top 10 singles in 2016 (France)

References

France
2016
2016 in French music